Lamiomimus chinensis is a species of beetle in the family Cerambycidae. It was described by Stephan von Breuning in 1936. It is known from China.

References

Lamiini
Beetles described in 1936